eDreams ODIGEO  (sometimes referred to as simply "eDreams") is a Spanish online travel company that was formed in 2011 as the successor of eDreams with the merger of online travel agencies eDreams and GO Voyages, and the acquisition of Opodo (which included Travellink).

The company is the largest online travel group in Europe, and the largest distributor of online flights in the world. It has over 17 million customers in 45 countries with 40,000 destinations and 575 airlines. The company sells flights, hotels, vacation packages (flight and hotel), train tickets, car rentals, and travel insurance. Its headquarters are in Madrid with more than 1,700 employees worldwide.

History
In 2010, Axa acquired Go Voyages and Permira acquired eDreams. Axa and Permira merged eDreams and Go Voyages, which jointly acquired Opodo in 2011.

EDreams ODIGEO was created in June 2011 when eDreams merged with Go Voyages and Opodo, the three largest European online travel agencies, through two private equity firms, AXA Private Equity and Permira Funds. EDream's co-founder, Javier Perez-Tenessa, became the president of the holding group. By March 2014, the company reached €500 million in sales.

eDreams Odigeo announced an intention to list on the Madrid, Barcelona, Bilbao and Valencia stock exchanges in early 2014. On April 8, 2014, the company completed its initial public offering on the Bolsa de Madrid, at 10.25 euros per share, which valued the company at around $1.5 billion. This was the first ever initial public offering of an Internet startup in Spain. The sale of shares was managed by financial organizations including JPMorgan Chase & Co., Deutsche Bank AG and Jefferies Group LLC. It was the first company to go public in Spain since 2011. However, after five months the stock price had fallen by 60%, reflecting the shared challenges of a difficult European IPO market. The stock later stabilized, with significant gains in share price including 160% gain in 2016.

In January 2015, eDreams announced that former Chief Operating Officer Dana Dunne was promoted to CEO. Previous CEO Javier Perez-Tenessa became honorary chairman. That December, Odigeo opened new offices in Barcelona on Bailén Street.

The company received industry awards including "Best Online Travel Partner Global 2015" (CFI.co), "Best Flight Booking Website 2015" (British Travel Awards) and "Best international Expansion" (eAwards – EMOTA).

In June 2016, it launched free intelligent push notifications on mobile apps for iOS and Android devices, so that travelers can be notified of any flight delays, cancellations and diversions as well as gate announcements and baggage claim areas.

Odigeo acquired the BudgetPlaces brand and portfolio from EnGrande in January 2017.

After completing a strategic review in November 2017 compiled by Morgan Stanley, it was announced that Odigeo was considering takeover bids in January 2018. In March 2018, it was reported that Odigeo would not accept the unsolicited offers from potential investors. The company announced it would transform its business model based on income diversification and price policy change.

Odigeo released a flight cancellation guarantee in May 2018 so that customers are able to cancel flights the day of a scheduled flight with an 80 percent refund of the ticket price for any reason. The policy gives travelers flexibility through the availability of a refund, with a maximum refund limit per person.

Brands
EDreams Odigeo has five brands that offer flights, hotels, car rentals and vacation packages.

eDreams 
EDreams was the first internet travel company in Europe and first online travel agency in Spain.

In 1999, eDreams was founded in Silicon Valley by Javier Perez-Tenessa, James Hare and Mauricio Prieto.

Opodo 
A joint venture between nine European airlines including Aer Lingus, Air France, Alitalia, Austrian Airlines, British Airways, Finnair, Iberia, KLM and Lufthansa in August 2000 created a new company, Opodo. Amadeus took a controlling stake in the company in 2004, and increased its stake to 99.74 percent in 2008. In 2009, Amadeus took control of 100 percent of Opodo's stake after acquiring AirLingus' shares. Amadeus sold Opodo to AXA Private Equity and Permira funds in February 2011. Opodo continues to operate as a leading online travel agency in the UK.

Go Voyages 
Go Voyages is a travel service company that manages airline tickets, hotel bookings, weekend stay and flight management. It is a leader in the French market.

Travellink
Travellink was founding in 2000 and was acquired by Opodo in 2005. It became part of Odigeo with Opodo. Travellink is the number one travel company in Scandinavian countries. In 2016, Odigeo sold the corporate travel business of Travellink in German, Sweden, Finland, Norway and Denmark to Flight Center Travel.

Liligo 
In 2005, the travel search engine Liligo was established. It raised two funding rounds, including a 3 million euro round in 2008. In 2010, Liligo was acquired by Voyages-SNCF.com. Liligo was acquired by Odigeo in 2013. The company operates in Hungary.

Products

Prime
In October 2017 eDreams ODIGEO launched a travel subscription program called eDreams Prime. The company’s Prime program initially included discounts on airfare and later in June 2020 it expanded also to accommodation. Prime has registered a growth of subscribed members from 125,000 in the first quarter to 450,000  in the second quarter of 2020. Faced with the pandemic, eDreams Odigeo launched a giveaway campaign offering new subscribers a free six month trial period for Prime.

In June 2020 eDreams Odigeo expanded its subscription program, Prime, to add accommodation. The product, which previously covered only flights, has been expanded to hotel fares (on more than 2.1 million hotels worldwide since November 2020) and is available on eDreams, Opodo and GO Voyages. According to eDreams Odigeo, Prime members can save an average of €250 per trip combining hotels and flights.

In May 2021 eDreams Odigeo’s travel subscription service Prime reached one million subscribers. The OTA’s subscription model increased its membership by +58% over the year to 876,000 subscribers and it reached one million subscribers in May. eDreams Odigeo forecasts to reach two million subscribers by September 2022.

Prime hotels 
In June 2020, eDreams ODIGEO expanded its subscription program, Prime, to add accommodation. The product, which previously covered only flights, has been expanded to hotel fares (on more than 2.1 million hotels worldwide since November 2020) and is available on eDreams, Opodo and GO Voyages. According to eDreams ODIGEO, Prime members can save an average of €250 per trip by combining hotels and flights.

New tech hubs 
eDreams ODIGEO announced the launch of two new tech hubs in Porto and Milan in the first quarter of 2020. The company hired 100 employees between the two offices in Portugal and Italy, including front and back-end engineers, and iOS and Android developers. This tech force works across eDreams ODIGEO's 261 websites worldwide and alongside its product and developers teams based respectively in Barcelona and Madrid.

AI-powered industry insights 
In October 2020, eDreams ODIGEO launched a new data insights service to help tourism organisations and local governments understand travel trends and consumer habits. The service is available on a subscription basis depending on the data requested. eDreams ODIGEO’s data is used by tourist boards and policy makers to support their tourism strategy and boost national economies. The data are also used to target audiences and regain market share especially, in the post pandemic era.

Annual studies and reports

Best airlines in the world 
eDreams ODIGEO produces an annual classification of the best airlines in the world for its eDreams brand. The airline ranking is based on data collected from bookings and customer surveys on over 650 airlines.

In 2021, eDreams ODIGEO updated its methodology to include more components relevant to the COVID-19 pandemic. The new classification rated airlines based on refund viability, flight cancellations, ticket flexibility, customer experience and COVID-19 safety measures. In 2021, Qatar Airways was named the best airline in the world by eDreams.

Best airports in the world 
From 2010 to 2019, eDreams ODIGEO published an annual study of the best and worst airports in the world. Airports were rated on their overall appeal as well as for their waiting areas, shopping facilities and restaurants. A score out of 5 was given to each airport to form the ranking of best and worst airports in the world.

In 2019, eDreams only published the best airports in the world ranking, without publishing the worst airports in the world.

COVID-19 travel trends report 
eDreams ODIGEO uses booking data to predict the next years’ travel trends. In 2020, it used data from 17 million customers to reveal the most booked destinations for the following year. In 2021, Lisbon was the most booked destination for European travellers.

The COVID-19 pandemic in 2020-2021 saw a shift in Europeans favouring short-haul flights over long-haul flights as travel remained uncertain. During the pandemic, customers booked their flights and holidays less in advance than in other years. In the summer of 2020, 33% of travellers booked their flights 0–5 days before departure, compared to 2019 when the most popular time period to book travel was 31 days in advance.

Consumer booking preferences report 
In 2021, eDreams ODIGEO commissioned an independent poll with OnePoll to reveal traveller booking preferences post-COVID-19. 10,000 adults from 8 countries were surveyed to understand how consumers book online travel. The findings from the poll revealed that 75% of respondents expressed a preference to book via an OTA as opposed to direct with an airline due to convenience and cost.

Best time to book annual study 
eDreams ODIGEO produces an annual study of the best time of year to book a flight, based on bookings made through their websites in the previous years.

The best time to book study is published on Opodo, one of the eDreams ODIGEO brands. In 2020, the study found that the cheapest month for booking a flight was January.

Corporate affairs
The leadership team includes Dana Dunne (Chief Executive Officer), David Elizaga (Chief Financial Officer) and Gerrit Goedkoop (Chief Operating Officer) as well as Carsten Bernhard (Chief Technology Officer).

Thomas Vollmoeller serves as chairman and Javier Perez-Tenessa is honorary chairman. The Board of the Company includes Thomas Vollmoeller, Carmen Allo, Dana Dunne, David Elizaga, Daniel Setton, Lise Fauconnier, Benoit Vauchy, Pedro López and Amanda Wills.

Criticism

Involvement in Israeli settlements
On 12 February 2020, the United Nations published a database of all business enterprises involved in certain specified activities related to the Israeli settlements in the Occupied Palestinian Territories, including East Jerusalem, and in the occupied Golan Heights. EDreams ODIGEO and its subsidiary company, Opodo, have been listed on the database in light of their involvement in activities related to "the provision of services and utilities supporting the maintenance and existence of settlements". The international community considers Israeli settlements built on land occupied by Israel to be in violation of international law.

References

Online travel agencies
Companies based in Barcelona
2011 establishments in Spain
Transport companies established in 2011
Internet properties established in 2011
2014 initial public offerings